Francis "Frank" Healy (born in Handsworth, Birmingham, England) is a former Napalm Death guitarist. Healy also was the bass player for Cerebral Fix.  He also played bass in the first live Anaal Nathrakh session for the John Peel show.  He was the bassist in the band Benediction from 1991 until 2017. He's currently in Sacrilege since 2014 as well as in Memoriam since 2016.

References

Death metal musicians
English heavy metal guitarists
Napalm Death members
Living people
1962 births
Musicians from Birmingham, West Midlands
People from Handsworth, West Midlands